Pinocchio is a 2014–2015 South Korean television series starring Lee Jong-suk, Park Shin-hye, Kim Young-kwang, and Lee Yu-bi. With 20 episodes, the show aired on SBS from 12 November 2014 to 15 January 2015.

As of 23 January 2015, it has an accumulated view of 1 billion on Chinese video-sharing website Youku.

Synopsis
In the year 2000, Ki Ha-myung is leading a happy life with his parents and elder brother, Jae-myung, until his father, Ki Ho-sang, the captain of a firefighting squad, dies in a factory explosion during a rescue attempt, along with several of his men. Ho-sang's body initially goes missing, and the media sensationalizes the case by scapegoating him. In a battle for ratings, cold and calculating MSC reporter Song Cha-Ok alleges that Ho-sang survived the blast and is currently in hiding because he was responsible for the deaths of his men. This causes the Ki family to become outcasts in their neighborhood and objects of national scorn. Ki Ho-sang's wife kills herself and Ha-myung by jumping off a cliff, and the elder son, Jae-myung, blames their deaths on the media, particularly Cha-ok.

But Ha-myung is alive, having been rescued from the water by Choi Gong-pil, a kind elderly man who lives on Hyangri Island. Gong-pil, who may either have Alzheimer's disease or trauma-induced memory loss, believes that Ha-myung is his older son Choi Dal-po, a simpleton who died thirty years earlier. Ha-myung embraces the deception and treats Gong-pil as his father. Gong-pil officially adopts Ha-myung, now named Dal-po, and places him in the family register as his eldest son. Five months later, when Gong-pil's younger son, Choi Dal-pyung, moves to the island with his daughter, Choi In-ha, they are flabbergasted to be told by Gong-pil to address a mere boy as their "older brother" and "uncle", respectively. Choi In-ha has "Pinocchio syndrome", which causes her to hiccup whenever she tells a lie. She idolizes her mother and hates living on the island after her parents' divorce. The fledgling friendship between Dal-po and In-ha is dashed, however, when he learns that In-ha's mother is none other than Song Cha-ok.

Five years later, In-ha and Dal-po are seniors and classmates at their small-town high school. Dal-po, who is a genius, pretends to be dumb and gets all zeroes in his test scores to keep up the deception in front of Choi Gong-pil. With his last-place class standing and scruffy, country bumpkin hair, Dal-po is friendless at school, while In-ha is the most popular girl. Dal-po secretly likes In-ha, and he is forced to join a televised quiz show at first to prevent Ahn Chan Soo, who has a crush on In-ha, from confessing to her on national TV. At the TV studio, Dal-po runs into the show producer, Hwang Gyo-dong, who had been a YGN reporter and one of Cha-ok's rivals but changed careers after what happened to the Ki family. After seeing Dal-po on TV, and despite knowing that her Pinocchio syndrome limits her career choices, In-ha decides to become a journalist.

In 2013, the Choi family has moved back to the city. In-ha has spent the last three years after college studying to become a reporter but continuously fails her job interviews. On the other hand, due to the poverty-stricken condition of the Choi family, Dal-po is forced to work as a taxi driver to make ends meet. Cha-ok, who hasn't seen her daughter in a decade and is now MSC's nightly news anchor and section chief, fails In-ha at her final interview, saying a reporter with Pinocchio syndrome would be useless. Seeing how hurt In-ha is at her mother's rejection, Dal-po becomes determined to help her achieve her dream and announces that he wants to become a reporter as well. A month later, In-ha and Dal-po apply at YGN's "blind" audition for broadcast news reporters, but only Dal-po gets hired. When confronted by Gyo-dong, now chief of YGN's news desk, Dal-po confesses his real identity as well as his real motive for taking the job: he wants to find his older brother, Jae-myung, and clear their father's name. But what he doesn't know is that Jae-myung has taken revenge on the factory workers who lied about their father by killing all of them and framing his last victim for the murders by hiding his body and making it seem like he is on the run. Meanwhile, with MSC's credibility rating at an all-time low, Cha-ok hires In-ha, using her Pinocchio syndrome in a publicity stunt. Thus, Dal-po and In-ha become rookies at rival networks, and among their colleagues are Seo Beom-jo, who comes from a rich, sheltered chaebol background and has a connection to In-ha via a wrong cellphone number, and Yoon Yoo-rae, once a sasaeng fan who now uses those obsessive and determined traits in her new job.

Later in her line of work, In-ha discovers Choi Dal-po's real identity and is disgusted by what her mother Cha-ok did to his family during the fire accident. In a lecture held by Cha-ok, In-ha stands against her and in the process, reveals to Jae-myung that his brother is alive. Together, they try to bring Cha-ok down through their honest news reporting, all the while uncovering a bigger conspiracy in the news industry.

Cast and characters

Main
 Lee Jong-suk as Choi Dal-po/Ki Ha-myung
 Nam Da-reum as young Dal-po/Ha-myung
A young man whose family is torn apart by a tragedy, who assumes a different identity and attempts to rebuild his life.
 Park Shin-hye as Choi In-ha
 Roh Jeong-eui as young In-ha
A young woman who suffers from a condition that causes her to hiccup whenever she tells a lie. She goes on to become a reporter, and her friendship with Choi Dal-po/Ki Ha-myung takes her life in unexpected directions.
 Kim Young-kwang as Seo Beom-jo
 A young reporter who becomes entwined in the lives of In-ha, her mother, and the intrigues of journalism.
 Lee Yu-bi as Yoon Yoo-rae
 A past sasaeng fan who decides to become a reporter.

Supporting

MSC Newsroom
 Jin Kyung as Song Cha-ok
 In-ha's estranged mother. A cold, merciless woman who chose to abandon her family for her career. She eventually became one of the best news anchors in the industry.
 Kim Kwang-kyu as Kim Gong-joo
 Chief of the MSC news desk.
 Kim Young-hoon as Lee Il-joo
 Im Byung-ki as Yeon Doo-young
 Yoon Seo-hyun as Lee Joo-ho
 Lee Seung-ho as Jae Dae-gook

YGN Newsroom
 Lee Pil-mo as Hwang Gyo-dong
 Chief of the YGN news desk. Gyo-dong works with the motto "the truth can change the world". He looks out for Dal-po and tries to discreetly help him in proving his family's innocence.
 Min Sung-wook as Jang Hyun-kyu
 Kang Shin-il as Lee Young-tak
 Jo Deok-hyun as Jo Won-gu
 Choo Soo-hyun as Im Jae-hwan

Family
 Jung In-gi as Ki Ho-sang, Ha-myung's father
 Jang Young-nam as Ha-myung's mother
 Yoon Kyun-sang as Ki Jae-myung, Ha-myung's older brother
 Shin Jae-ha as young Jae-myung
 Byun Hee-bong as Choi Gong-pil, In-ha's grandfather
 Shin Jung-geun as Choi Dal-pyung, In-ha's father
 Kim Hae-sook as Park Rosa
A wealthy CEO who owns several malls and who seems to be a doting mother who spoils her son, Beom-jo. Rosa hides a darker side, however, having conspired with Song Cha-ok to deliberately twist the news in order to protect her interests.

Extended
 Lee Joo-seung as Ahn Chan-soo
 Kim Min-young as Song Yeong-joo
 Park Soo-young as Jung Gi-bong
 Yoon Jin-young as Firefighter
 Yeom Dong-hyun as Factory supervisor
 Choi Jong-hoon as Factory worker
 Kim Young-joon as Neighborhood boy with Pinocchio syndrome
 Ahn Sun-young as Broadcast station writer
 Woo Hyun as Dal-po's homeroom teacher
 Im Do-yoon as Go Ji-hee
 Lee Jung-soo as Lost hiker
 Hong Hyun-hee as Teacher Yoon
 Lee Seung-woo as Ahn Joon-ki, Chan-soo's eldest child

Special appearances
 Im Sung-han as Quiz show host (eps. 1–2)
 Jang Gwang as High school principal (ep. 2)
 Jung Woong-in as Min Joon-gook (ep. 2)
 Jang Hang-jun as Director (ep. 2)
 Kim Min-jung as Dal-po's blind date prospect (photo, ep. 3)
 Lee Bo-young as Hye-sung car navigation (voice, ep. 3)
 Kim Hee-chul as Yoo-rae's cellphone wallpaper (photo, ep. 8)
 Bae Suzy as Beom-jo's blind date prospect (photo, ep. 12)
 Yoon Sang-hyun as Cha Gwan-woo, Jae-myung's public defender (ep. 12)
 Lee Joon as Fama, idol singer investigated for propofol use (ep. 19)
 Kangnam as Cha-ok's student (ep. 20)
 Shin Jae-ha as himself (ep. 20)
 Oh Seung-ah as MSC news reporter interviewer

Production
The series reunited actors Lee Jong-suk and Kim Hae-sook with screenwriter Park Hye-ryun and television director Jo Soo-won, who had collaborated a year before on I Can Hear Your Voice.

The first script reading took place in October 2014 at SBS Production Center in Ilsan.

Original soundtrack
English titles are adapted from iTunes and credits from Naver Music.

Part 1

Part 2

Part 3

Part 4

Part 5

Part 6

Part 7

Part 8

Part 9

Ratings
In the table below, the blue numbers represent the lowest ratings and the red numbers represent the highest ratings.

Awards and nominations

Notes

References

External links
  
 
 

2014 South Korean television series debuts
2014 South Korean television series endings
Seoul Broadcasting System television dramas
Korean-language television shows
Television shows based on The Adventures of Pinocchio
Television series about television
Television series about journalism
South Korean romance television series
Television shows written by Park Hye-ryun
Television series by IHQ (company)